State highways in Mississippi are maintained by the Mississippi Department of Transportation. The state numbers its highways in a grid-like pattern, much like the U.S. Route numbering scheme. One and two-digit routes are primary highways.

Odd-numbered routes run north–south and start from MS 1, which runs along the Mississippi River, to MS 25, which runs near the Alabama border. In addition to routes 1 through 25, routes 27 through 41 repeat this pattern over the first several routes, still increasing in number from west to east, and routes 43 and higher generally run in the southern part of the state.

Even-numbered routes run east–west; these start from MS 2, which runs near the Tennessee state line, and continue to MS 26, which runs in the southern part of the state. With the exception of MS 28, the next several even routes are aligned over routes 2 through 26 in a similar fashion.

Exceptions to the numbering scheme
There are several state highways that are out of place; they do not fit the numbering scheme:
 MS 5 runs east of MS 7.
 MS 22 runs between MS 16 and MS 18.
 MS 23 runs east of MS 25.
 MS 27 runs between MS 33 and MS 35.
 MS 28 runs between MS 18 and MS 24, but it was MS 20 before I-20 was built.
 MS 29 runs between MS 37 and MS 39.
 MS 46 runs between MS 32 and MS 42.
 MS 50 runs between MS 32 and MS 42, but it was MS 10 before I-10 was built (this fit into the grid, between MS 8 and MS 12).
 MS 67 runs between MS 53 and MS 57, but it was MS 55 before I-55 was built.
 MS 76 was the number given to the Pontotoc bypass in place of MS 6; this may be the number for the entire Corridor V of the Appalachian Development Highway System The bypass was recently renamed MS 6/US 278 after the completion of the corridor portion that reconnects west of Tupelo. It has since been applied to another section of Corridor V in Itawamba County.

Three-digit highways
Three-digit highways are organized by their first digit. Routes beginning with a 1 are aborted alignments of U.S. Routes; these include highways 145, 149, 161, 172, 178, 182, 184, and 198. These highways are scattered over their "parent" routes, and have segments beginning and ending in several cities. The exception is MS 178, which covers almost all of the old road (US 78 was relocated onto a new freeway alignment throughout the entire state). U.S. Routes 11, 51, 65, 80, 90, and 278 do not have corresponding state highways (11, 51, 80 and 90 all largely parallel an Interstate highway, while 65 is extremely short within the state and 278 was only recently extended westward), but most of them have at least one aborted alignment.

Highway 245 in Okolona and Crawford is the only three-digit Mississippi Highway to begin with a 2. This is because it is the old alignment of Alternate US 45.

Mississippi highways 301 through 614 are secondary highways that are generally shorter than one- and two-digit highways. These routes are organized so that the 300s run in the northern part of the state, the 400s run in the north-central section, the 500s run in the south-central section, and the 600s run in the most southern section. These routes are numbered like other state highways, with odd routes running north–south and even routes running east–west. The numbering generally increases from the east / north to the west / south within their respective areas.

The state of Mississippi also maintains a system of mostly unsigned state highways, numbered ranging from 701 to 992.

Finally, Mississippi has several scenic highways that run near the state's lakes. These include Scenic Routes 32, 304, 315, and 333. They are signed with a blue shield and run loops connecting to the state's normal highways of the same number. For example, Scenic Route 304 runs from I-55 in Hernando along MS 304 west to MS 301, turning south to loop around Arkabutla Lake and connect to MS 306 and I-55 in Coldwater.

List of numbered Mississippi state highways
Each of the numbered Mississippi state highways are listed below with their termini.

Highways numbered above 700
Highways that are legislatively numbered between 701 and 994 run mostly along main streets and major roads through the state's towns and cities. Many of these routes are unsigned. The 700s run through the northern part of Mississippi, the 800s run through the central part, and the 900s run through the southern part. These roads are generally not arranged in any pattern because they are so short (many run less than a mile).

Northern Mississippi (701-795)

Central Mississippi (801-897)

Southern Mississippi (902-992)

Scenic routes

These are specially designated state highways that run around the state's many Dams (entirely in the northern part of the state). They are numbered the same as a nearby highway, with most serving as a spur or loop off of said highway. All of them connect to Interstate 55 at-least once.

 - Enid Dam; runs from I-55/MS 32 in Oakland to US 51 near Pope
 - Arkabutla Dam; runs from I-55/MS 306 in Coldwater to I-55 in Hernando (until 2006, it connected to its parent, MS 304, with the two running concurrently with each other between Eudora and I-55 in Hernando)
 - Sardis Dam; runs from US 51/MS 35 in Batesville to I-55/MS 315 in Sardis
 - Grenada Dam; runs from I-55/MS 8 in Grenada to I-55/US 51/MS 7 north of Grenada (only one that both its parent route, MS 333, is unsigned, as well as entirely overlapping its parent)

Special exception

Mississippi Highway 5 is labeled, and signed into law since March 2, 1989, as a scenic route for its entire. This is not a separate scenic route, nor is it signed with the iconic blue shields. It does however have the scenic route markers above the number shield throughout its length except for the intersection with US 72

Former highways

 - former designation for MS 50
 - former designation for MS 35 south of Columbia
 - former designation for MS 28
 - formerly the designation for what is now US 84 west of Waynesboro
 - formerly ran from Starkville to south of West Point; this became part of MS 25 and is now Old West Point Road 
 - became mainline MS 35
 - former designation for MS 37
 - former designation for US 45 Alternate
 - former designation for MS 67
 - formerly the designation for what is now MS 15 from MS 26 to Biloxi
 - former designation for MS 57
 - former temporary designation for the western section of the Pontotoc Parkway in Pontotoc, now MS 6/US 278
 - was located entirely in Tunica County; ran from US 61 near Maud through Dubbs to MS 4 near White Oak.
 - MS 4 west of Ashland to US 78 east of Lake Center
 - MS 32 through Banner to MS 9 east of Banner
 - Former designation for what is now MS 1 between Sherard (at intersection with MS 322) to northern end at intersection with US 49
 - Tippo Road; ran from MS 8 in Philipp, north through Macel, Tippo, and Effie to MS 32 in Cowart
 - Cascilla Road; ran from MS 35 in Leverett, through Cascilla, to US 51 between Tillatoba and Grenada
 - ran from MS 8 near Gore Springs to MS 330 near Gums
 - formerly the designation for what is now Antioch Road from MS 334 in Toccopola to MS 9
 - Algoma Road; ran from MS 341 to MS 15 in Algoma
 - from the Alcorn-Tippah county line to MS 2 near Gorforth's Place
 - Tippah County Road 500 (CR 500); ran from MS 15  in Ripley to MS 2
 - ran from US 72 in Iuka east to the Alabama state line
 - ran from MS 12 north to Caledonia at MS 378
 - US 45 east via Caledonia to MS 12
 - from the Itawamba-Monroe county line to MS 371 near Evergreen
 - Fentress-Panhandle Road; ran from MS 12 in Fentress to MS 14
 - Old Gauley Road/ Old Hwy 8; ran from Calhoun City to Grenada Lake
 - Hester Road; ran from MS 9 to MS 15 north of Reform
 - MS 16 southeast to MS 427 south of Edinburg
 - US 49W near Inverness to MS 7 via Inverness Road
 - US 49E at Cruger to MS 12
 - MS 16 to MS 43 via Forest Grove Road
 - MS 35 south of Kosciusko to MS 25 via Nile Road, County Road 1101, and Rocky Point Road
 - Attala? appears only as a floating shield on 1958 map; MS 14/19 southwest to MS 35
 - US 51 south of Canton east to MS 3 via Yandell Road
 - US 61 in Vicksburg to MS 462 via Fisher Ferry Road
 - northeast from MS 468 at Whitfield
 - MS 15 to MS 485 via CR 418
 - CR 20 and CR 31 from MS 503 to MS 18 in Rose Hill
 - MS 15 in Larel via Lower Myrick Road and Mill Creek Road
 - US 84 in Collins to MS 532 via Salem Church Road
 - MS 35 in Raleigh west via current MS 540; then followed Dry Creek Road
 - Liberty Road from US 61 (no longer part of it now) in Natchez to MS 33
 - ran from Centreville to MS 569 near Liberty
 - MS 33 in Gloster northeast via Busy Corner Road to MS 567
 - ran from the Louisiana state line (LA 62) to MS 48 near Sandy Hook
 - ran from US 11 in Carriere to MS 603 in Necaise
 - ran from MS 43 near Logtown to US 11/MS 43 Picayune
 MS 615 - formerly the designation for what is now MS 57 from US 45 to MS 594 (which at the time continued west to US 98 via what is now MS 57)
 - former spur from US 51 into Tillatoba. No longer on the route log.
 - former loop off of MS 178 through Red Banks. No longer on the route log.
 - former spur from US 49E into Yazoo City. No longer on the route log.
MS 923 - formerly the designation for what is now MS 571
 - former designation for what is now MS 605 south of I-10
 - former designation for what is now the proposed MS 601
 - former designation for what is now the proposed MS 615 south of I-10
 - former designation for what is now MS 605 north of I-10
 - former designation for what is now MS 619
 - former designation for what is now MS 617
 - former designation for what is now MS 618

See also

References

External links
 Mississippi Department of Transportation
 Mississippi Public Roads Statistics - Extent, Travel, and Designation (PDF) (includes a route log)
 Magnolia Meanderings by Adam Froehlig
 Mississippi State Highway Endpoint Photos by Adam Froehlig
 Mississippi Highway Ends by Robert Lee
 General Highway Map of Mississippi
 Official Highway Map of Mississippi

 
State